Croom is an unincorporated community and census-designated place in Southern Prince George's County, Maryland, United States. As of the 2020 census it had a population of 2,720. Croom largely consists of former tobacco farms and forests converted to Washington bedroom subdivisions such as nearby Marlton. The main (Jug Bay Natural Area) part of Patuxent River Park is in Croom.

History

The community was patented in 1671 as Croome by Christopher Rousby; it was named for the manor of Croom, near Sledmere in the East Riding of Yorkshire. In August 1814, British forces marched through Croom on their way to the Burning of Washington in the War of 1812.

St. Thomas' Episcopal Church dates to colonial times and was listed on the NRHP in 2000. Other buildings on the National Register of Historic Places located at Croom are the John W. Coffren House and Store, Bellefields, Brookefield of the Berrys, Mattaponi (John Bowie Jr. House), St. Thomas' Episcopal Parish Historic District, and Waverly.

The Columbia Air Center was located in Croom from 1941-1956. It was among the first African-American owned airports in the United States.

Geography

Demographics

2020 census

Note: the US Census treats Hispanic/Latino as an ethnic category. This table excludes Latinos from the racial categories and assigns them to a separate category. Hispanics/Latinos can be of any race.

Government
Prince George's County Police Department District 5 Station in Clinton CDP serves the community.

Education
Prince George's County Public Schools operates public schools serving the census-designated place.

Elementary schools serving sections of Croom are Baden, Brandywine, Marlton, Mattaponi, and Patuxent. Most areas are zoned to Gwynn Park Middle School, with some zoned to James Madison Middle School and Kettering Middle School. Most areas are zoned to Frederick Douglass High School in Croom, with some areas to the north zoned to Dr. Henry A Wise, Jr. High School and some to the south zoned to Gwynn Park High School.

Notable people
William Duckett Bowie (1803–1873), politician
 Robert Bowie, governor of Maryland (1750–1818) 
 William Williams (c. 1793–1814), an escaped slave who enlisted in 38th United States Colored Infantry Regiment and died from his wounds after the British bombardment of Fort McHenry in the War of 1812.

References

Census-designated places in Maryland
Census-designated places in Prince George's County, Maryland